Muhammad ibn Abd Allah al-Aftah ibn Ja'far al-Sadiq was a figure whose existence is contested: a portion of the Fathite Shia Muslims (followers of Abdullah al-Aftah ibn Ja'far al-Sadiq), believed that Muhammad was the son of Imam Abdullah al-Aftah (died 766 CE), whom they believed to be the Imam after his father Ja'far al-Sadiq.  This assertion is contested by others, including many Fathites, who believe that Abdullah died without issue.

When Abdullah al-Aftah died without an issue to succeed him in the Imamate, a portion of his followers believed in the necessity of the continuation of the Imamate in the children and the grandchildren of the Imam through pure vertical inheritance. Due to this they could not shift to the belief in the Imamate of the brother of Abdullah al-Aftah, Musa al-Kadhim. They therefore believed that Abdullah secretly had a son, claiming that this son was the Mahdi. They argued: "His name corresponds to the famous Prophetic hadith (of Muhammad): 'His name (i.e. the Mahdi) is my name (i.e. Muhammad), the name of his father is the name of my father (i.e. Abdullah).'"

There maybe evidence that he had a son named Sayed Alawi.

Some of his ancestors and relatives

See also
Descendants of Ali ibn Abi Talib

References

Bibliography
Al-Maqalat wa al-Firaq, by Sa'ad Ibn Abdillah al-Ash'ari al-Qummi (d. 301), pg.88

Arab people of Iranian descent
Family of Muhammad
Husaynids
Shia imams